A bodice is an article of clothing traditionally for women and girls, covering the torso from the neck to the waist. The term typically refers to a specific type of upper garment common in Europe during the 16th to the 18th century, or to the upper portion of a modern dress to distinguish it from the skirt and sleeves. The name bodice is etymologically an odd plural spelling of "body" and comes from an older garment called a pair of bodies (because the garment was originally made in two separate pieces that fastened together, frequently by lacing).

Origin

Frescoes produced by the Minoan civilization portray women wearing open bodices that displayed and accentuated their breasts; however, following the Late Bronze Age collapse, these garments would give way to the simpler clothes characteristic of Iron Age Greece.

Contemporary European bodices are derived from the kirtle.  A fitted bodice became fashionable in Europe around 1450.

Classification

The same word is used to refer to several related concepts, some of which also have other names.

In one usage, bodice refers to a separate upper garment that has removable sleeves or no sleeves, often low-cut, worn in Europe from the 16th century to the 18th century, either over a corset or in lieu of one. To achieve a fashionable shape and support the bust, the bodice was frequently stiffened with bents (a type of reed) or whalebone. The bodice was separate from the corset of the time because the bodice was intended to be worn over the other garments, and the others were undergarments.

In another usage, particularly in Victorian and early 20th century fashion, a bodice (in earlier sources, body) instead indicates the upper part of a dress that was constructed in two parts (i.e., with separate skirt and bodice, such as a ballet tutu), but of matching or coordinating fabric with the intention of wearing the two parts as a unit. In dressmaking, the term waist (sometimes called dress waist to distinguish it from a shirtwaist) was also used. During wear, the parts might be connected by hooks and eyes. This construction was standard for fashionable garments from the 18th century until the late 19th century, and had the advantages of allowing a voluminous skirt to be paired with a close-fitting bodice, and of allowing two or more bodices to be worn with the same skirt at different times.  For example, a woman might wear the skirt with a matching high-necked bodice during the day, and later the same skirt with a different, fashionably low-necked bodice in the evening. One-piece construction became more common after 1900 due to the trend for looser, more simply-constructed clothing with narrower skirts.

Bodice continues in use to refer to the upper portion (not including the sleeves) of a one- or two-piece dress. The bodice of a dress was called the corsage in the 19th century.

Styles 
In earlier periods, bodices and corsets were laced in spiral fashion, with one continuous lace. Some bodices were laced in the back.  In later periods, both were laced like the modern tennis shoe, with eyelets facing one another. This was more convenient for women who had to dress themselves.  In the 20th century, lacing was replaced by elastic or other styles.

Padding, boning, and other techniques were used to keep the fitted bodice smooth while it was worn.  Pregnant women wore an adjustable type of bodice, called a jump.

Starting in the 16th century, women used detachable sleeves as a fashion accessory.  A ruff or other decorations might be added.  By the 18th century, women were wearing a variety of accessories, including fichus and partlets, with their bodices. 

In the 19th century, in parts of Europe, styles reflected local folk dress, so that the bodice in France was frilled, in Austria took the form of the dirndl, and in Bulgaria, it had a gold stomacher.  Other styles seen in the 19th century include:

 the casaquin bodice, 
 the coat-bodice inspired by men's frock coats, 
 the long cuirasse bodice, which was also called the Joan of Arc bodice,
 the pointed Marie Stuart bodice, 
 the modest Circassian bodice, 
 the amazon corsage, 
 the bag bodice, which was popular in Canada,
 the Agnes Sorel bodice, which had a high, square-cut neckline and was worn with bishop sleeves,
 the casaque bodice, 
 the antique bodice, which, despite its name, was the new fashion in its time,
 the pleated Grecian-style Norma corsage, 
 the Anglo–Greek bodice with wide lapels,
 the bébé bodice with its sash, 
 the Empire bodice with its scarves,  
 the beribboned bohemian-style baby bodice, and
 the Elizabethan bodice, which was reflected the styles popular in the Elizabethan era, but which was worn during the late Victorian era.

Today
Bodices survive into modern times in the traditional or revived folk dress of many European countries, as in the case of the Austrian dirndl and Scottish highland dancers' Aboyne dress. They are also commonly seen today at gatherings celebrating archaic European customs, such as Oktoberfest festivals, Society for Creative Anachronism events, and Renaissance Fairs.

Modern variants include the halter bodice and the Indian choli.

See also
 Anggiya
 Bodice ripper

References

Further reading
 Arnold, Janet: Patterns of Fashion: the cut and construction of clothes for men and women 1560–1620, Macmillan, 1985. .

External links
 
 

16th-century fashion
17th-century fashion
18th-century fashion
19th-century fashion
20th-century fashion
History of clothing (Western fashion)
Medieval European costume
Tops (clothing)
Women's clothing